DeLaca Island is a small U-shaped island  west of Bonaparte Point, off the southwest coast of Anvers Island. DeLaca Island is one of two main investigation areas in a United States Antarctic Research Program (USARP) study of terrestrial arthropods. DeLaca Island was named by the United States Advisory Committee on Antarctic Names (US-ACAN) for Ted E. DeLaca, a member of the University of California, Davis, California, biological team working this area, 1971–1974.

See also
 Composite Antarctic Gazetteer
 List of Antarctic and sub-Antarctic islands
 List of Antarctic islands south of 60° S
 SCAR
 Territorial claims in Antarctica

References

 

Islands of the Palmer Archipelago